Tudeh (also Romanized as Tūdeh; also known as Tūdeh-ye Deh-e Bālā and Tūden) is a village in Shirkuh Rural District, in the Central District of Taft County, Yazd Province, Iran. At the 2006 census, its population was 98, in 38 families.

References 

Populated places in Taft County